A total solar eclipse will occur on Tuesday, May 22, 2096. A solar eclipse occurs when the Moon passes between Earth and the Sun, thereby totally or partly obscuring the image of the Sun for a viewer on Earth. A total solar eclipse occurs when the Moon's apparent diameter is larger than the Sun's, blocking all direct sunlight, turning day into darkness. Totality occurs in a narrow path across Earth's surface, with the partial solar eclipse visible over a surrounding region thousands of kilometres wide.
This will be the first eclipse of saros series 139 to exceed series 136 in length of totality. The length of totality for saros 139 is increasing, while that of Saros 136 is decreasing.

Related eclipses

Solar eclipses 2094–2098

Saros 139

Notes

References

2096 05 22
2096 in science
2096 05 22
2096 05 22